Roman Musil is a Paralympian athlete from the Czech Republic competing mainly in category F33 throwing events.

Musil has competed in three Paralympics over two sports. In 2000 he won two gold and a silver in the athletics class F33 Javelin (gold), shot put (gold), and discus (silver) as well as a gold and bronze in the cycling class CP division 2 Mixed Tricycle 5.4 km time Trial (gold) and Mixed Tricycle 1.9 km Time Trial. This would be his last time entering cycling events as in 2004 he won the gold in the shot put F33/34 class but missed out in the discus. In the 2008 edition he competed in the combined F33/34/52 class javelin and shot and won his seventh medal, a bronze, in the discus.

External links
 

Paralympic athletes of the Czech Republic
Paralympic cyclists of the Czech Republic
Athletes (track and field) at the 2000 Summer Paralympics
Athletes (track and field) at the 2004 Summer Paralympics
Athletes (track and field) at the 2008 Summer Paralympics
Cyclists at the 2000 Summer Paralympics
Paralympic gold medalists for the Czech Republic
Paralympic silver medalists for the Czech Republic
Paralympic bronze medalists for the Czech Republic
Living people
Medalists at the 2000 Summer Paralympics
Medalists at the 2008 Summer Paralympics
Year of birth missing (living people)
Medalists at the 2004 Summer Paralympics
Paralympic medalists in athletics (track and field)
Paralympic medalists in cycling
Czech male discus throwers
Czech male javelin throwers
Czech male shot putters